Kochuveli Terminal –Mangaluru Junction Antyodaya Express is an express train belonging to  division, Southern Railway zone that runs between  and  . It operates with 16355/16356 train numbers on bi-weekly basis. It is the first unpainted stainless steel train of India. This train answers the long standing demand of the people of North Kerala for a fourth train to the capital. 

The train runs two times/week. Widespread protests erupted when the train didn't stop at Tirur, Kasaragod, and Alappuzha, questioning the need for this train. Several MLAs blocked the train at Kasaragod demanding a stop there.

Service 

The Mangaluru to Kochuveli train (16356) leaves Mangaluru junction every Friday and Sunday at 8 PM and reaches Kochuveli at 8.15 AM the next day. The reverse train (16355) leaves Kochuveli every Thursday and Saturday at 9.25 PM and reaches Mangaluru Jn. at 9.15 AM the next day.

Coach composition 
The trains offers only LHB general coaches (unreserved) designed by Indian Railways. LED screen display shows information about stations, train speed etc. Vending machines offer water. Toilets in compartments as well as CCTV cameras and mobile charging points are present. The rake of this train is not shared with any other services.

Traction 
It is hauled by a Royapuram-based WAP-7 locomotive.

Route

Kochuveli

 (experimental stop for 6 months)
Mangaluru Junction

See also 
 Antyodaya Express

Notes

References

External links

Antyodaya Express trains